Fiesta of the Damned is a Big Finish Productions audio drama based on the long-running British science fiction television series Doctor Who.

Plot
The Seventh Doctor, Ace and Mel find themselves in late 1930s Spain during the time of its civil war.

Cast
The Doctor — Sylvester McCoy
Ace — Sophie Aldred
Mel — Bonnie Langford
Enzo Squillino Jnr — Juan Romero
Christopher Hatherall — George Newman
Owen Aaronovitch — Antonio Ferrando/Control Unit
Tom Alexander — Luis/Phillipe

Other parts portrayed by members of the cast.

Reception
Starburst Magazine rated the audio drama at nine out of ten stars, writing that "despite the odd point at which it can drag, Fiesta of the Damned shines thanks to a great setting brought to life masterfully, a fierce alien menace, and some deep, well acted character stories." The Sci-Fi Bulletin's Paul Simpson also reviews Fiesta of the Damned favorably, calling it a "strong tale set against an unfamiliar backdrop."

References

External links
SciFi Online - Review: Fiesta of the Damned

2016 audio plays
Seventh Doctor audio plays